Weobley Castle may refer to:

Weobley Castle, Herefordshire
Weobley Castle, Gower

See also
Weoley Castle